The Italian electoral law of 2017, colloquially known by the nickname Rosatellum bis or simply Rosatellum after Ettore Rosato, the Democratic Party (PD) leader in the Chamber of Deputies who first proposed the new law, is a parallel voting system, which acts as a mixed electoral system, with 37% of seats allocated using a first-past-the-post electoral system and 63% using a proportional method, with one round of voting. The Chamber and Senate of the Republic did not differ in the way they allocated the proportional seats, both using the largest remainder method of allocating seats.

The new electoral law was supported by the PD and its government ally Popular Alternative but also by the opposition parties Forza Italia, Lega Nord, and Liberal Popular Alliance. Despite many protests from the Five Star Movement, the Democratic and Progressive Movement, Italian Left, and Brothers of Italy, the electoral law was approved on 12 October 2017 by the Chamber of Deputies with 375 votes in favor and 215 against, and on 26 October 2017 by the Senate with 214 votes against 61.

The law regulates the election of the Chamber and Senate, replacing Porcellum of 2005 and Italicum of 2015, both modified by the Constitutional Court of Italy after judging them partly unconstitutional.

History

As a consequence of the result of the 2016 Italian constitutional referendum, in which the Senate reform was rejected, the two chambers of the Italian Parliament ended up with two different electoral laws, which lacked uniformity. As a matter of fact, the electoral law for the Chamber of Deputies passed by Matteo Renzi's government, the so-called Italicum, based on a strong winner-take-all principle, was still in effect, whereas in the Senate a pure proportional system (the remnants of the so-called Porcellum, the electoral law approved by the cabinet of Silvio Berlusconi in 2005 and then declared extensively unconstitutional by the Constitutional Court in January 2014) was in force. The two systems differed on several aspects, among which the possibility of forming coalitions before the elections (only allowed at the Senate) and the election thresholds.

In June 2017, the Democratic Party together with the Five Star Movement, Forza Italia and Northern League agreed on a law, known as Tedeschellum, which was based on a similar system to the one used in Germany. However, the agreement among the four parties did not survive a secret-ballot vote during the first reading at the Chamber of Deputies and the bill was put aside.

After few weeks Ettore Rosato, the leader of the group of the Democratic Party at the Chamber of Deputies, proposed a new bill based on a mixed system, with half of the seats allocated using the first-past-the-post and the other half using a proportional allocation. The bill was not popular in its original version, since several opposition parties considered the number of seats allocated with the FPTP system too high.

A later and revised version of the Rosatellum, known as Rosatellum bis was approved by PD, FI, LN, AP and ALA in October 2017, becoming the new electoral law for both the houses of the Parliament.

Main characteristics and operation
The national elections use a mixed single vote into a parallel voting system, with 36.% of seats allocated using a first-past-the-post electoral system and 63.% using a proportional method (the latter including the seats allocated to Italians abroad), with one round of voting. The Senate and the Chamber of Deputies do not differ in the way the proportional seats are allocated, both using the largest remainder method of allocating seats.

Following the 2020 constitutional referendum, the Senate of the Republic included 200 elected members, of whom:
 74 are elected in single-member districts.
 122 are elected by proportional representation.
 4 are elected by the Italians abroad.
 a small, variable number of senators-for-life include former presidents of the Republic and no more than 5 other persons appointed for life by a president of the Republic, according to special constitutional provisions (scientists, writers, artists, social workers, politicians, tycoons).

The Senate is elected on a single ballot. The ballot includes the district's member, on a purely plurality basis and the parties and party-lists were listed that supported him, which was used to determine the proportional seats, with a 3% minimum threshold for party representation.

Following the 2020 referendum, the Chamber of Deputies had 400 members, of whom
 147 are elected in single member districts.
 245 are elected by proportional representation.
 8 are elected by the Italians abroad.

As the Senate, the Chamber of Deputies is elected on a single ballot.

The complicated mechanism known as scorporo, which was used to tabulate PR votes in the Mattarellum, was abolished in the new electoral law.

The law also re-introduced a closed list system for the party lists on the second ballot, i.e., excluding voters from the decision as to which members of that party would enter parliament, thereby guaranteeing reelection of party leaders whose popular support was rapidly declining (new elections were to be held once the new electoral law was fully implemented).

Ballot paper 

The ballot, which is a single one for the first-past-the-post and the proportional systems, shows the names of the candidates to single-member constituencies and, in close conjunction with them, the symbols of the linked lists for the proportional part, each one with a list of the relative candidates.

Voters will be able to cast their vote in three different ways:
 Drawing a sign on the symbol of a list: in this case the vote extends to the candidate in the single-member constituency which is supported by that list.
 Drawing a sign on the name of the candidate of the single-member constituency and another one on the symbol of one list that supports the candidate: the result is the same as that described above; panachage is not permitted, meaning voters cannot vote simultaneously for a candidate in the FPTP constituency and for a party list which is not linked to that candidate.
 Drawing a sign only on the name of the candidate for the FPTP constituency, without indicating any list: in this case, the vote is valid for the candidate in the single-member constituency and also automatically extended to the list that supports them; if that candidate is however connected to several lists, the vote is divided proportionally between them, based on the votes that each one has obtained in that constituency.

In an effort to mitigate fragmentation, split-ticket voting is not allowed.

Graphical summary

From 2018 until 2022

Since 2022

Distribution of seats by region

From 2018 until 2022
Chamber of Deputies

Senate of the Republic

Reforms

Adaptation to constitutional reform 
Law 51/2019 was meant to adapt the Rosatellum to a reduction of the number of seats in both houses of the Italian Parliament. It became law on 26 June 2019. It has been called a riformina elettorale, or little electoral reform.

A constitutional amendment procedure was initiated during the 18th legislature by the Five Stars Movement, to cut the size of both houses by more than a third (from 630 and 315 members, to 400 and 200). 
To avoid incompatibility with the proposed amendment, the 2019 law adapts the Rosatellum law, and sets fractions for each type of seat (proportional or majoritary) instead of exact numbers. The ratio of single-winner districts over the total number of seats in Rosatellum was equal to 3/8 in both houses, and the law 51/2019 retains those proportions. 

Besides the Five Stars Movement, the law was supported by Lega and was opposed by the Democratic Party, until it joined the Conte II Cabinet in August 2019.

Germanicum 
On the 9 January 2020, Giuseppe Brescia, President of the lower house's Constitutional Affairs Committee, submitted bill AC 2329 (nicknamed Germanicum) that would replace Rosatellum with a system based on proportional representation. The bill would abolish single member constituencies, end the use of joint lists and increase the threshold from three to five percent nationally, while creating the 'right of tribune' where if a party did not reach the national threshold they could gain representation if they earned a quotient in at least three constituencies in two regions in the Chamber and in the Senate the party would need to receive a quotient in a constituency. Seats in the Chamber would firstly be apportioned on national results then subsequently into multimember constituencies, while in the Senate the process is similar but seats are first apportioned regionally, with both Houses using the Imperiali quota.

Previous systems

Italicum (2015–2017)

The Italian electoral law of 2015, better known as Italicum, a name given to it in 2014 by the Democratic Party secretary and subsequently head of government Matteo Renzi, who was its main proponent (until the end of January 2015 with the support of Forza Italia's leader Silvio Berlusconi) provides for a two-round system based on party-list proportional representation (the former being ruled out as unconstitutional), corrected by a majority bonus and a 3% election threshold. Candidates run for election in 100 multi-member constituencies with open lists, except for a single candidate chosen by each party who is the first to be elected.

The law, which came into force on 1 July 2016, regulates the election of the Chamber of Deputies, replacing the previous electoral law of 2005, modified by the Constitutional Court in December 2013 after judging it partly unconstitutional.

The law was written under the assumption that, by the time it came into force, the upper house would have become an indirectly-elected body representing regions, with greatly reduced powers, thus making a reform of its electoral system unnecessary. The upper-house reform, rejected in the 4 December 2016 Constitutional Referendum, was originally assumed to be adopted without a Referendum by 1 July 2016.

It is the first electoral law approved by the Italian Parliament but never used in a general election.

History 
The electoral law passed by the centre-right government in 2005 immediately received widespread criticism: among other things, critics called into question the use of long closed lists of candidates (which gave party executives great power in deciding the composition of the Parliament), and the regional mechanism of allocation of seats in the Senate (which made the existence of a "clear winner" of the elections less likely).

After two unsuccessful attempts at repealing the law by referendum, in the 2013 general election the law failed to produce a majority in the Senate; as a consequence, the only way to form a government was by means of a grand coalition between left-wing and right-wing parties that had harshly fought each other in the election. The resulting Letta Cabinet was perceived by many people as the second "unelected government" in a row (after the Monti Cabinet).

While the coalition agreed that a new electoral law was needed, it failed to agree on a specific model. The Democratic Party executive and prime minister Enrico Letta even went as far as requesting that his party vote against a parliamentary initiative by fellow democrat Roberto Giachetti to restore the previous Mattarella law. This was probably done out of concern that the grand coalition supporting his government would not hold.

On 4 December 2013, the Constitutional Court judged the electoral law of 2005 partly unconstitutional: in particular, its unlimited majority bonus was repealed. This made an electoral reform ever more urgent, since proportional representation without majoritarian correction is thought to be incompatible with the competitive party system of Italy.

A few days after, on 8 December 2013, Matteo Renzi became the new leader of the Democratic Party. In his victory speech, he vowed to change the electoral law against the risk of "stabilized grand coalitions". Renzi's initiative ultimately led to him taking Letta's place as the prime minister. Finally, Renzi made a deal with Silvio Berlusconi for a set of institutional reforms, including a new majority-assuring law based on a two-round system, conceived to make the event of a forced Grand Coalition impossible.

The bill still faced harsh opposition, even from members of the proposing parties: however it was approved by the Chamber of Deputies on 12 March 2014 and, in an amended form, by the Senate on 27 January 2015 with the support of a large majority.

After the election of Sergio Mattarella as the new President of Italy on 31 January 2015, Berlusconi withdrew his support of the bill. In order for it to receive its final approval by the Chamber of Deputies, the government decided to link it to a confidence vote (hinting at a snap election in case of a negative outcome). The bill was finally approved on 4 May 2015 and signed by President Mattarella two days later.

Main characteristics and operation 
The Italicum system regulates the attribution of 617 of the 630 seats of the Chamber of Deputies, excluding 12 seats attributed to representatives of Italians living abroad, and one seat for the Aosta Valley region. An uncommon feature of this system is that it is majority assuring, thanks to a jackpot that is assigned to the winning party, possibly after a second electoral round.

The territory of Italy is divided into 100 constituencies electing between 3 and 9 deputies depending on their size. For each constituency, the parties designate a list of candidates: "head of list" candidates can run in up to 10 constituencies, while other candidates are limited to a single constituency. Gender balance is promoted by requiring that, in each region, head of lists of either sex for the same party should not exceed 60% of the total; additionally, candidates in all lists must be in a sequence alternating by gender.

At the first round, electors receive a ballot allowing them to vote for a single party and for its head of list candidate (pre-printed on the ballot), and are given the option to express up to two additional preference votes for other candidates of that party, by writing their name next to the party symbol. If two preference votes are expressed, they must be of a different sex: otherwise, the second preference is discarded.

Only parties passing a 3% minimum threshold in the first round are assigned seats. If the party receiving the plurality of the votes passes a 40% threshold, it is attributed a minimum of 340 seats (54%). The remaining seats are allocated to the other parties in a proportional fashion, and no second round takes place.

If no party has been able to pass the 40% threshold, a second round takes place two weeks after the first one: this time electors receive a ballot where they are allowed to choose between the two parties that received most votes in the first round. The party winning the second round is attributed 340 seats, and the remaining 277 seats are allocated to the other parties in a proportional fashion, according to the results of the first round.

The proportional allocation of seats follows the largest remainder method. Each party receives a certain number of seats depending on its national result: these seats are then projected onto the 100 constituencies and attributed to the candidates of that constituency, starting from the head of list and then according to the number of preference votes.

An amendment, known as "Erasmus amendment", makes sure Italians studying abroad in the Erasmus programme can vote.

Constitutional review

On February 24, 2016 a court in Messina sent the election law for review to the Constitutional Court: declaring admissible the application by petitioners, the judges called for the Constitutional Court to decide whether eight out of the petitioners' 13 claims that the Italicum breached the Italian Constitution. The Constitutional Court might still decide that the unconstitutionality hypothesis is not founded, and even refuse to examine it. The court's decision is not expecting until after 2017 January.

A constitutional reform bill passed by the Italian Parliament in April 2016, which is still awaiting popular confirmation by referendum, will require the Constitutional Court to decide on the constitutional legitimacy of the electoral law even if the aforementioned application is rejected. This extraordinary procedure will only take place if the referendum confirms the bill.

Porcellum (2005–2015)

The previous electoral law had a series of thresholds to encourage parties to form coalitions. It replaced an Additional Member electoral system which had been introduced in the 1990s. The attempt to change the law with the referendum failed and was the Constitutional Court, the judgment no. 1 of 2014, to eliminate various unconstitutional elements that were part of the law.

The block voting system is nationwide-based for the House, and regional-based for the Senate. Italy is divided into a certain number of districts for the Chamber of Deputies, whereas each Region elects its senators. Each district is assigned a number of seats proportionate to its total of the population of Italy. The winning coalition receives at least 55% of the seats on national level in the House, and on regional level in the Senate, while the remaining seats are proportionally divided between minority parties. For the House, seats won by each party are then allocated at district level to decide the elected candidates. Candidates on the lists are ranked in order of priority, so if a party wins for example ten seats, the first ten candidates on its list receive seats in parliament.

The law officially recognized coalitions of parties: to be part of a coalition, a party must sign its official program and indicate its support for the coalition's candidate to the prime-ministership.

Chamber of Deputies
For the Chamber of Deputies, Italy is divided into 26 constituencies: Lombardy has three constituencies, Piedmont, Veneto, Lazio, Campania, and Sicily each have two, and all other regions have one. These constituencies jointly elect 617 MPs. Additionally one MP is elected from the Aosta Valley and 12 are elected by a constituency consisting of Italians living abroad.
Seats are allocated among the parties that pass thresholds of the total vote on a national basis:
 Minimum 10% for a coalition. If this requirement is not met, the 4% limit for single parties apply.
 Minimum 4% for any party not in a coalition.
 Minimum 2% for any party in a coalition, except that the first party below 2% in a coalition does receive seats.

Also, parties representing regional linguistic minorities obtain seats if they receive at least 20% of the ballots in their constituency.

In order to guarantee a working majority, a coalition or party which obtains a plurality of the vote, but less than 340 seats, is assigned additional seats to reach that number, corresponding roughly to a 54% majority.

Inside each coalition, seats are divided between parties with a Hare method, and consequently assigned to each constituency to elect single candidates.

Senate of the Republic

For the Senate, the constituencies correspond to the 20 regions of Italy, with 6 senators allocated for Italians living abroad. The electoral system is partly similar to the one for the lower house, but is in many ways transferred to regional basis. After judgment 1/2014 of the Constitutional Court, the voting system for the Senate aims at party-list proportional representation without majority bonus. The thresholds are different, and applied on a regional basis:
 Minimum 20% for a coalition.
 Minimum 8% for any party not in a coalition.
 Minimum 3% for any party in a coalition.

The electoral system for the senate, proportional representation without majority bonus, does not guarantee a clear majority for any party-list in the Senate, unlike the national super-assignment system in the Chamber of Deputies.

Criticism
The new electoral law has come under wide criticism from the centre-left opposition since its introduction for a series of reasons including instability, large parties bias, partitocracy, adaptation to opinion polls, and no agreement with the opposition, as the law was passed by the majority against the opinion of the opposition. Many felt that the "rules of the game" should be agreed upon by everybody, and not imposed by one side. The system is considered by its opposers to be less stable than the previous additional member system. The region-based system in the upper house is not guaranteed to produce a clear majority, and may pave the way for governmental crises. Despite this criticism, Berlusconi's coalition won a clear majority after 2008 elections, both in the Chamber and Senate.

It was widely alleged in the press at the time of its introduction, that the new system had been custom-designed by Silvio Berlusconi's government to give advantage to his House of Freedoms coalition in the 2006 elections, by eliminating seats for the numerous small parties on the Left that might not reach the 2% threshold. In the event, these small parties formed alliances to reach the threshold, and the centre-left won a surprise victory despite the system.

It has been alleged that Italian parties have retained too much power in the First Republic, screening the choices citizens had in elections; this electoral law would maintain fixed electoral lists, where voters can only express a preference for a list but not for a specific candidate. This can be used by parties to all but guarantee re-election to unpopular but powerful figures, who would be weaker in a first past the post electoral system (a system never used in Italy in its pure form after World War I).

In Italian elections, the left tend to fare better in direct confrontation than in proportional voting, a sign there are voters who trust left-wing candidates but not right-wing parties. It is alleged that the centre-right majority in the Parliament undertook this reform to boost their chances in the upcoming elections of 2006, which they lost by a very small margin.

Mattarellum (1993–2005)

Between 1991 and 1993, resulting from two referendums and legislation, Italian electoral law was altered substantially. Electoral law in Italy is determined by Parliament, not by the constitution. This, along with the concurrent collapse of the Italian party system, marks the transition between the First and Second Italian Republics.

Two referendums
The nearly pure proportional representation system of the First Republic had resulted not only in political fragmentation and therefore governmental instability, but also insulation of the parties from the electorate and civil society. This was known in Italian as partitocrazia, in contrast to democracy, and resulted in corruption and pork-barrel politics. The Italian constitution allows, with substantial hurdles, abrogative referendums, enabling citizens to delete laws or parts of laws passed by Parliament (with exceptions).

A reform movement known as COREL (Committee to Promote Referendums on Elections), led by maverick DC-member Mario Segni, proposed three referendums, one of which was allowed by the Constitutional Court (at that time packed with members of the PSI and hostile to the movement). The June 1991 referendum therefore asked voters if they wanted to reduce the number of preferences, from three or four to one, in the Chamber of Deputies, to reduce the abuse of the open-list system by party elites and ensure accurate delegation of parliamentary seats to candidates popular with voters. With 62.5% of the Italian electorate voting, the referendum passed with 95% of those voting in favor. This was seen as a vote against the partitocrazia, which had campaigned against the referendum.

Emboldened by their victory in 1991, and encouraged by the unfolding Mani pulite scandals and the substantial loss of votes for the traditional parties in the 1992 general elections, the reformers pushed forward with another referendum, abolishing the proportional representation system of the Italian Senate, implicitly supporting a plurality system that would theoretically force parties to come together around two ideological poles, thereby providing governmental stability. This referendum was held in April 1993, and passed with the support of 80% of those voting. This caused the Amato government to collapse three days later.   Municipal elections were held in June 1993, further illustrating the lack of legitimacy the sitting parliament held. The President of Italy, Oscar Luigi Scalfaro, thereupon appointed a technocratic government, led by former head of the Bank of Italy, Carlo Azeglio Ciampi, with the sole task of writing a new electoral law.

As it was under no constitutional obligation to enact a purely majoritarian system (nor were they under obligation to promulgate a new electoral law for the Chamber of Deputies), and cognizant of its declining popular support, the sitting parliament enacted a new electoral law in August 1993 that provided for single-member districts while reflecting their own interests. Despite this, many of them would be voted out of office in the national election in March 1994.

Electoral law
The national elections used an Additional Member System, which in Italy was a mixed system, with 75% of seats allocated using a First Past the Post electoral system and 25% using a proportional method, with one round of voting. The Senate and the Chamber of Deputies did not differ in the way they allocated the proportional seats, both using the D'Hondt method of allocating seats.

The Senate included 315 elected members, of whom:
 232 are directly elected in single-member districts.
 83 are elected by regional proportional representation.
 a small, variable number of senators-for-life include former presidents of the Republic and several other persons appointed for life by a president of the Republic (no more than 5), according to special constitutional provisions (scientists, writers, artists, social workers, politicians, tycoons).

The Senate was elected on a single ballot. All those votes not contributing to a winning candidate were thrown into a regional pool, where the seats were allocated proportionally. There was no electoral threshold for the Senate.

The Italian Chamber of Deputies had 630 members, of whom
 475 are directly elected in single member districts.
 155 are elected by regional proportional representation.

The Chamber of Deputies used two ballots. The first ballot elected that district's member, on a purely plurality basis. The second ballot, in which only parties and party-lists were listed, was used to determine the proportional seats, allocated within one single national constituency, with a 4% minimum threshold for party representation.

A complicated mechanism known as scorporo, a previously unknown word in Italian politics, was used to tabulate PR votes. The number of votes cast for candidates coming in second place on the first ballot (SMD) would be subtracted from the number of votes earned on the second ballot (PR) by the party of the winning candidate in the first ballot. This would be repeated for each single-member district. This was developed – against the overwhelming opinion expressed in the referendums – to dampen the effect of the first-past-the-post system, which it was feared that it might promote the prevalence of one political party, especially parties that were strong in one geographical area.

The law also introduced a closed list system for the party lists on the second ballot, i.e., excluding voters from the decision as to which members of that party would enter parliament, thereby guaranteeing reelection of party leaders whose popular support was rapidly declining (new elections were to be held once the new electoral law was fully implemented). Ironically, that is what allowed Mario Segni, the leader of the reform movement, to enter parliament on the proportional ballot after the March 1994, elections, having broken with his party in March 1993, and then reunited with one of its shattered remnants that December.

The system did not accomplish the goals desired by the voters. The first parliament elected after the electoral reform produced Silvio Berlusconi's first government, which lasted eight months. Small parties still enter parliament and form unstable coalitions. On the other hand, political parties in Italy seem to be coalescing around two poles, if imperfectly so, and governments have lasted much longer, at least by Italian standards. On that level, the electoral reform can be seen as an improvement over the electoral law prior to it, even if Italy has now returned to a party-list system.

1946–1993 electoral system
Between 1946 and 1993, Italy used an electoral system that was a nearly pure proportional representation system, which was subject to two insignificant thresholds:

that a party needed to achieve 300,000 votes at the national level;
Italy was divided into 32 electoral regions (circoscrizioni), of unequal size, which were awarded a certain number of seats in Parliament based on population (e.g., Rome received more than 50). Within these regions, seats were divided proportionally; in order to become a member of parliament, a party member needed to be directly elected within one of these regions – approximately 60,000 votes. This system allocated 90% of the seats in both houses of parliament. The votes that did not go to a winning candidate were then thrown into one national electoral district, which was then divided proportionally and used to determine the remaining 10%, thereby going to candidates not directly elected.

Furthermore, voters were able to list their preferences for candidates on a party list, in order to prevent the parties from exploiting the power they acquired from being able to write their party lists. In practice, however, parties were able to manipulate these numbers so that preferred members, i.e., members loyal to one faction within a party, could enter parliament.

As neither of these thresholds was difficult to achieve, this system naturally benefitted the small parties. This was exacerbated by the fact that the Lower House has 630 seats. Because of the design of the electoral law did not provide for any mechanism to exclude small parties (indeed, it seemed designed to encourage them) or provide any incentives to avoid splintering, this resulted in highly unstable coalition governments (the average length was nine months) and political turbulence; and because voters had little control over which candidates entered parliament, political parties were insulated from the wishes of civil society. Relations between political elites and the masses therefore became clientelistic; voter behavior and politics in general became a contest as to which party could secure more pork-barrel investment for a specific region.

References

External links 

Election law
Law of Italy
Electoral reform in Italy